The 2020 Football Championship of Kharkiv Oblast was won by FC Univer-Dynamo Kharkiv.

League table

References

Football
Kharkiv
Kharkiv